The Active Shipbuilding Experts' Federation is an international non-governmental organization. Its purpose is to contribute sound development of international maritime transportation and further enhancement of the world maritime safety, marine environment protection and maritime security, through communication and cooperation among the shipbuilding industry on technical agenda especially in International Maritime Organization. The federation's activities cover matters in relation to building new ships as well as repair conversions, offshore units.

Members 
The Active Shipbuilding Experts' Federation has 10 members. which are constructing more than 90% of global share of new ship deliveries. Members are national shipbuilders' associations or a major shipbuilder in the absence of an association.
 China Association of the National Shipbuilding Industry (CANSI)
 Shipyard Association of India (SAI)
 Indonesia Shipbuilding and Offshore Industry Association
 The Shipbuilders' Association of Japan
 Korea Offshore & Shipbuilding Association
 Association of Marine Industries of Malaysia
 Colombo Dockyard PLC (Sri Lanka)
 Thai Shipbuilding and Repairing Association
 Turkish Shipbuilders' Association
 Shipbuilding Industry Corporation (in Vietnam)

Notes and references

External links
 Active Shipbuilding Experts' Federation

Marine engineering organizations
Organizations based in Seoul